Tankerton (formerly Tankerton-on-Sea) is a suburb of Whitstable in Kent in south-east England. It was designed in the late 19th century as the train network brought holidaymakers to the sea. It gives its name to a ward of Canterbury City Council.

History
The place-name 'Tankerton' is first attested in The Book of Fees for 1242, where it appears as Tangrenton. The name means 'the town or settlement of Tancred's people'.

Tankerton-on-Sea was a commercial development by the Tankerton Estate Company in the late 19th century, and was designed with a grid of streets leading from the shoreline. In 1890 the Tankerton Estate, including Tankerton Tower (now known as Whitstable Castle) was purchased for development by Charles Newton-Robinson, a road was built, the land was divided into plots and sold at auctions. The Tankerton Estates still exist and are managed by County Estate Agents in Whitstable.

Formerly Tankerton's coastline included a small pier, built in 1894, but this no longer exists, having been demolished in the 1910s.

In July 2018, the wreck of a Tudor era merchant ship appeared in the sand. One timber of her hull was felled in 1531. She measures 12m x 5m, and had a capacity of 100 to 200 tons. She is thought to have been in the Copperas trade. The wreck was discovered by local history volunteers, who reported it to Historic England. They commissioned a report from Wessex Archaeology. The government has now listed the vessel as the only wreck of its kind in south-east England.

Environment
The slopes to the shore are a site of special scientific interest (SSSI) because they support a population of Fisher's estuarine moth, Gortyna borelii lunata, whose sole larval food-plant is the large umbellifer hog's fennel (Peucedanum officinale) which grows well there. 

Tankerton has a Blue Flag beach and a Seaside Award, certified for high environmental standards.

Economy
The economy is based around tourism. The little wooden beach huts at the base of the slopes are currently highly desirable, and notable owners have included Tracey Emin, who sold hers to Charles Saatchi for £75,000.
Seaview Caravan Holiday Park adjoins Tankerton, and formerly also contained a large number of chalets, as well as static caravans and camping. It is one of the largest holiday parks on the North Kent coast

Demography
At the 2001 UK census, the Tankerton electoral ward had a population of 4583. The ethnicity was 98.7% white, 0.4% mixed race, 0.6% Asian, 0.2% black and 0.1% other.
The place of birth of residents was 95.3% United Kingdom, 0.7% Republic of Ireland, 1.3% other Western European countries, and 2.7% elsewhere. Religion was recorded as 80.2% Christian, 0.4% Buddhist, 0% Hindu, 0.1% Sikh and 0.2% Muslim. 12% were recorded as having no religion, 0.4% had an alternative religion and 6.6% did not state their religion.

The economic activity of residents aged 16–74 was 34.3% in full-time employment, 12.6% in part-time employment, 11.3% self-employed, 1.9% unemployed, 2.2% students with jobs, 3.2% students without jobs, 22.3% retired, 5.8% looking after home or family, 4% permanently sick or disabled and 2.4% economically inactive for other reasons. The industry of employment of residents was 17% retail, 10.9% manufacturing, 8.2% construction, 9.9% real estate, 13% health and social work, 13.2% education, 6.9% transport and communications, 5.9% public administration, 4.2% hotels and restaurants, 4% finance, 1.2% agriculture and 5.6% other. Of the ward's residents aged 16–74, 20.6% had a higher education qualification or the equivalent, compared with 19.9% nationwide.

Gallery

See also
Swalecliffe

References

External links
 

 https://www.thebeachguide.co.uk/south-east-england/kent/tankerton-beach.htm

Villages in Kent
Whitstable
Beaches of Kent